Pine Township is a township in Armstrong County, Pennsylvania, United States. The population was 351 at the 2020 census, a decrease from the figure of 412 tabulated in 2010.

Geography
Pine Township is located in northern Armstrong County, along the east bank of the Allegheny River and the south bank of Mahoning Creek. The unincorporated community of Templeton along the Allegheny River is the primary settlement in the township.

Recreation
Portions of Pennsylvania State Game Lands Number 287 are located in Pine Township just outside of Templeton.

Demographics

As of the census of 2000, there were 499 people, 202 households, and 143 families residing in the township.  The population density was 101.6 people per square mile (39.2/km).  There were 284 housing units at an average density of 57.8/sq mi (22.3/km).  The racial makeup of the township was 99.60% White, and 0.40% from two or more races. Hispanic or Latino of any race were 0.40% of the population.

There were 202 households, out of which 32.2% had children under the age of 18 living with them, 55.4% were married couples living together, 9.4% had a female householder with no husband present, and 29.2% were non-families. 26.2% of all households were made up of individuals, and 14.4% had someone living alone who was 65 years of age or older.  The average household size was 2.47 and the average family size was 2.94.

The township median age of 37 years was significantly less than the county median age of 40 years. The distribution by age group was 25.3% under the age of 18, 8.6% from 18 to 24, 30.1% from 25 to 44, 18.2% from 45 to 64, and 17.8% who were 65 years of age or older.  The median age was 37 years. For every 100 females, there were 104.5 males.  For every 100 females age 18 and over, there were 103.8 males.

The median income for a household in the township was $31,250, and the median income for a family was $33,558. Males had a median income of $31,364 versus $17,500 for females. The per capita income for the township was $17,824.  About 8.5% of families and 11.4% of the population were below the poverty line, including 13.3% of those under age 18 and 6.2% of those age 65 or over.

History
Pine Township appears in the 1876 Atlas of Armstrong County, Pennsylvania. Its early history is detailed in Robert Walter Smith's 1883 History of Armstrong County.

Cemeteries
Bell Town Road Cemetery
Stewardson Furnace Cemetery

References

Populated places established in 1790
Pittsburgh metropolitan area
Townships in Armstrong County, Pennsylvania
Townships in Pennsylvania